= CİMER =

Cumhurbaşkanlığı İletişim Merkezi
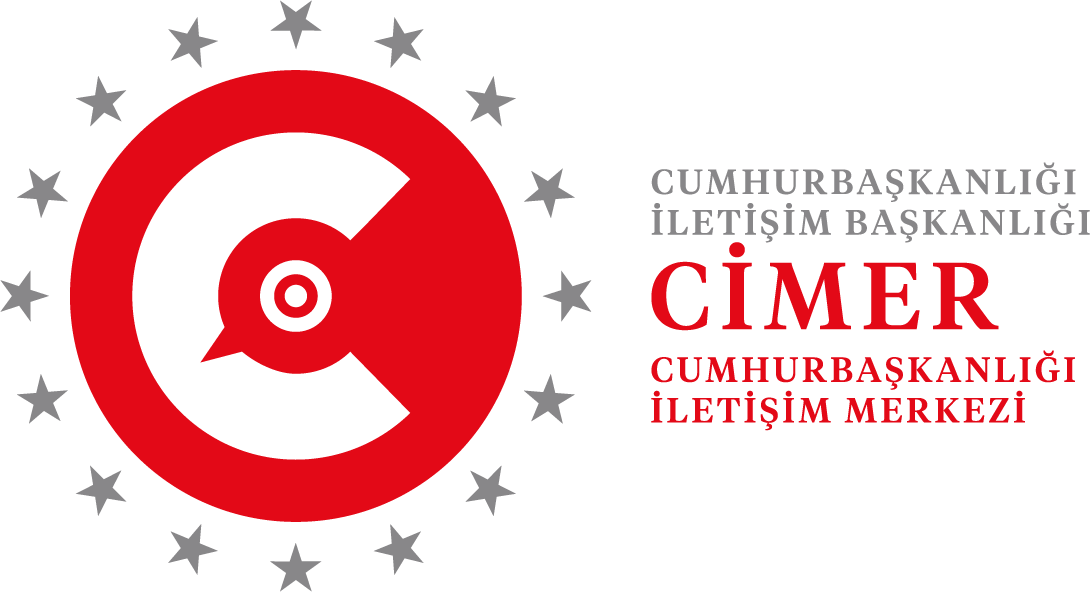
- Available in: Turkish
- Founded: 2015
- Predecessor: BİMER
- Country of origin: Turkey
- Website: cimer.gov.tr
- Users: c. 16,000 per day
- Current status: Active

Cumhurbaşkanlığı İletişim Merkezi (Presidential Communication Center), abrreviated as CİMER, is a system founded in 2015 allowing Turkish citizens to contact the Presidency of Turkey regarding complaints or to obtain information. The agency must respond to these inquiries within 15 or 30 days, depending on the type of request.

== Scope ==
CİMER allows Turkish citizens to contact the Presidency of Turkey regarding wishes, complaints or to obtain information.

CİMER can be contacted in several ways, such as via its own website, telephone, fax, regular mail or in person, though over 90% of inquiries are done via the website. Upon being contacted, an employer process the inquiry and generally forwards it to a more appropriate institution. This institution then writes a response which is sent back to the person once it gets approved by an official. The aim is to allow people who send a request to reach the relevant institution or organization quickly and effectively.

Legally, CİMER has to respond to complaints, suggestions and wishes within 30 days. For inquiries to obtain information, this limit is 15 days. Almost half of the requests sent to the system are complaints and 36% are wishes.

== History ==
CİMER was founded in 2015. In 2018, the Başbakanlık İletişim Merkezi (BİMER), a similar system that was used to contact the Prime Ministry, was merged into CİMER as the office was abolished. That same year, it received around 10,000 requests per day. The number of requests in 2022 increased to over 6 million (c. 16,000 per day).
